Tarland (Gaelic: Turlann) is a village in Aberdeenshire, Scotland and is located  northwest of Aboyne, and  west of Aberdeen. Population 720 (2016).

Tarland is home to the Culsh Earth House, an Iron Age below-ground dwelling that otherwise known as a Souterrain.  Souterrains were used to store food and the Culsh Earth House probably served as a community cellar.

Just south of Tarland is the Tomnaverie stone circle, a 4,000-year-old recumbent stone circle.  The land is owned by the MacRobert Trust and in the care of Historic Scotland.  The circle was recently restored with help from a donation by the trust.

Melgum Lodge near Tarland was originally built as a hunting lodge for the physician to Queen Victoria who frequently stayed in the vicinity at Balmoral Castle.

Tarland Church commemorates Mo Luag, a saint more often associated with the west coast.

According to legend, a wizard once lived in the area. It was said that he once came to Tarland Fair and cut open a cheese, which produced a swarm of bees.

In 2015 a new bike park was built in Drummy Woods of Tarland, bringing visitors to the local community. The bike park cost around £200,000 to build and features three different level of difficulty so it can suit cyclists of all abilities.

Notable people
 Admiral of the Fleet Sir Rhoderick Robert McGrigor retired to Tarland
 Alexander Starritt, author of critically acclaimed novel, "The Beast"
 Prof Alexander Boyd Stewart CBE FRSE (1904-1981) agriculturalist
 Philippa Tattersall, The first woman to pass the All Arms Commando Course.

References

External links

Cromar Parish Church

Villages in Aberdeenshire